The Minister for Foreign Affairs is the senior minister at the Ministry of Foreign Affairs of Greece. 

The incumbent Minister for Foreign Affairs is Nikos Dendias of New Democracy.

Ministers for Foreign Affairs since 1974

External links

Ministry of Foreign Affairs
Ministry of Foreign Affairs - Hellenic Aid

Ministry of Foreign Affairs (Greece)
Lists of government ministers of Greece
 
Ministries established in 1833
1822 establishments in Greece